Euchlaena obtusaria, the obtuse euchlaena moth, is a moth of the family Geometridae. The species was first described by Jacob Hübner in 1813. It is found in North America, where it has been recorded from Alberta east to Nova Scotia, south to Florida and Texas. The habitat consists of mixed wood forests.

The wingspan is 27–48 mm. The wings are purplish grey, tan or dark chestnut brown with yellow on the median area. There are black spots at the tip of the forewings. Adults are on wing from April to September.

The larvae feed on Rosa and Impatiens species. They are twig mimics. They are striped with pale and brown. The species overwinters in the larval stage.

References

Moths described in 1813
Angeronini